is a Japanese actress and voice actress. She used to be part of the Gekidan Tohai talent agency, and is now part of Horipro talent agency. She portrayed the young Ann Uekusa in the live-action drama Sand Chronicles. In anime, she provided the voice of title character Momo Miyaura in the 2011 film A Letter to Momo, and she provides the voice of main character Ichika Usami  Cure Whip in Kirakira PreCure a la Mode.

Filmography

Drama

Film

Anime

Dubbing roles

References

External links
  
  
 
 

1996 births
Living people
Horipro artists
Japanese child actresses
Japanese film actresses
Japanese television actresses
Japanese voice actresses
People from Higashimurayama, Tokyo
Voice actresses from Tokyo Metropolis
21st-century Japanese actresses